Mashiur Rahman is a Bangladesh Awami League politician, former secretary and currently, the Economic Affairs Adviser to the Prime Minister of Bangladesh Sheikh Hasina.

Early Career 
Mashiur Rahman was a former officer of CSP. After the end of 1971 Liberation War, he joined as the private secretary to Father of the Nation, President Bangabandhu Sheikh Mujibur Rahman. During his service period, he was posted in various posts of the central government as Secretaries. He was the chairman of National Board of Revenue and Secretary of Internal Resources Division. After the victory of Awami League in 7th national general election held in June 1996, he was posted as the Secretary of Economic Relations Division. Rahman retired from the service in 2001.

Political Career
Rahman has voiced support for Rampal Power Plant in the Sundarbans. He is the incumbent Economic Affairs Adviser (Cabinet Minister rank) to the Prime Minister of Bangladesh Sheikh Hasina. He was the chief election commissioner in the Awami League council elections in October 2016. He was accused of being involved in the Padma Bridge Scandal. Later the accusation was acquitted by a Canadian court finding no proof of any corruption regarding Padma Bridge scandal. He was appointed to an adviser post in 2014 with the rank of a minister.

References

Awami League politicians
Living people
Year of birth missing (living people)